Supernova is the second full-length album by British rock duo Nova Twins, released 17 June 2022 by Marshall Records. The album peaked at No. 14 and No. 27 on the Scottish and UK album charts, respectively, and was nominated for the 2022 Mercury Prize.

Background

The album's impending release was announced in February 2022, with the songs "Antagonist", "K.M.B.", "Cleopatra", "Puzzles" and "Choose Your Fighter" issued as singles to preview the album. The album's lyrics are inspired by Nova Twins' experiences playing live before increasingly diverse audiences, after a long layoff from touring during the COVID-19 pandemic, which was particularly challenging because their previous album Who Are the Girls? was beginning to attract critical notice just before the onset of the pandemic. The album is also inspired by the racial justice developments of the period. As described by the band: "making this album became our medicine through a turbulent time. It’s a reflection of where we were and how far we have come, encased in a fantasy world that we imagined."

Critical reception 

The album received critical acclaim upon its release. At Metacritic, which assigns a weighted mean rating out of 100 to reviews from mainstream critics, it received an average score of 92, based on 10 reviews indicating "Universal acclaim".  The Guardian praised the album's "sharp, concise songwriting [that] makes for a mindblowing blast of distorted noise-pop – and destroys the narrative about who gets to make rock music." Many reviewers noted the Nova Twins' blending of disparate genres, with Distorted Sound proclaiming that the album "show[s] that genre is worthless." NME called the album "More dynamic, more experimental and with far more range than what’s come before." Consequence reached a similar conclusion, stating that "Nova Twins bend and blend genres like alchemists, generating a sound specific to them and the undertones of their social movement."

The Forty Five called the album "a triumph" that "should make Nova Twins an unignorable force from hereon in." The Line of Best Fit praised the band for "marry[ing] politically charged lyricism with a searing amalgamation of genres, producing an album that practically begs to be experienced in a full-throttle live setting." In its review of the album, Ghost Cult magazine concluded that "Nova Twins are rising as torchbearers for the future of rock music, flawlessly executing elements no one would’ve ever expected to hear from the style ten years ago."

Track listing

Personnel

Nova Twins 
 Amy Love – guitar, lead vocals
 Georgia South – bass, backing vocals, drum programming

Additional personnel 
 Jake Woodward - drums (tracks 1, 2, 6, 8, 11) 
 George MacDonald - drums (tracks 3, 4, 5, 7, 9, 10)     
 Gerard Roberts - additional drum programming (tracks 3, 4, 5)   
 Romesh Dodangoda - additional programming (tracks 8, 9, 10)

Charts

References

2022 albums